Tissahamia maturata is a species of spider in the family Pholcidae. It is endemic to Sri Lanka.

Taxonomy
The species was first described in 2011 by Huber as Pholcus maturata. It was transferred to the new genus Tissahamia in 2018 as a result of a molecular phylogenetic study.

See also 
 List of Pholcidae species

References

Pholcidae
Endemic fauna of Sri Lanka
Spiders of Asia
Spiders described in 2011